Melanie Alvarez (born Melanie Hernandez Calumpad), better known by her stage name Kyla, is a Filipino R&B singer-songwriter occasional actress and presenter.

Kyla began her career in 2000 under OctoArts EMI Philippines and rose to prominence with the release of her second single "Hanggang Ngayon" (English translation: "Until Now"). The song won the MTV Viewers' Choice for Southeast Asia at the 2001 MTV Video Music Awards making her the first East Asian female artist to win at the MTV Video Music Awards

Known in the Philippines as "the Queen of R&B", her work has earned her several achievements, including a star on the Walk of Fame in the Philippines, and MTV Video Music Award, twelve Awit Awards, four MTV Philippines Music Award, and six MYX Music Awards. She was honored by the Philippines Society of Composers, Singers, and Publishers for her contributions to music as one of the first pioneers of R&B music in the country.

In 2015, Kyla signed with Cornerstone Entertainment and transferred to ABS-CBN after over 15 years with GMA Network. Kyla signed a contract with Star Music after 16 years with  PolyEast Records (EMI Philippines) on December 6, 2016.

Kyla was a member of the Filipino project girl group DIVAS along with KZ Tandingan, Yeng Constantino, and Angeline Quinto.

Biography

Early life and discovery
Born Melanie Hernandez Calumpad in Tondo, Manila, she was weaned on her parents' old school soul and jazz records: Ella Fitzgerald, Billie Holiday, and Aretha Franklin. She soon developed an affinity for singing, hogging the mic every single chance she gets. By her 10th birthday, she was already joining many prestigious TV singing contests. "Tanghalan ng Kampeon" was her first singing contest but on DZRH "Hamon sa Kampeon" was her first win in 1991. She was lording over "Tanghalan ng Kampeon" for six straight weeks, and with her powerful interpretation of Jennifer Holliday's "I Am Changing" became the show's grand champion in 1993. She graduated high school at San Sebastian College - Recoletos and earned her bachelor's degree of BS Mass Communication in Philippine Christian University.

Veteran director Al Quinn saw her potential and encouraged her to join the immensely popular Wednesday group of That's Entertainment, an afternoon variety show on GMA Network using her real name, Melanie, as her screen name. Melanie represented the country in the Fourth Yamaha Music Quest in August 1995 in Japan, where she interpreted the Vehnee Saturno original, "Only World".

In 1997, she brought home the third prize trophy in the Metropop Young Singers' Competition (later renamed Metropop Star Search). Soon GMA's Infiniti Records offered Melanie, along with fellow Metropop Star Search winners Carmela Cuneta and Jonard Yanzon, to wax a couple of songs for a compilation album, Kung Umiibig. She recorded two solo tracks: "I Wish You Love" and "Kung Magkikita Tayo Muli", which would later re-emerge as a Vina Morales signature hit, "Muli".

Armed with "One More Try", composed by Raymund Ryan Santes, she again joined the Metropop Song Festival in 2000. The song failed to make it in the Top 12m but did make it to EMI, whose manager, Francis Guevarra, signed her to a recording deal with EMI Philippines in April 2000. She was given the stage name Kyla.

2000–2003: Debut, early success, and international work

Way to Your Heart
Kyla made her big debut in 2000 with Way To Your Heart with its hit carrier single, "Bring It On." The album brought out the realization that yes, the country's first honest-to-goodness R&B has arrived. Comparisons to R&B superstars Brandy and Aaliyah began to surface.

However, it was her second single, the piano-driven ballad "Hanggang Ngayon" that turned out to be Kyla's breakthrough hit, topping a host of FM radio charts. The song's music video, which was directed by Lyle Sacris, further boosted the song's popularity. The video won for Kyla an award at the MTV Video Music Awards and two big honors trophies at the 2001 MTV Pilipinas Awards: Best New Artist and Video of the year. Her video even went on to win the MTV Southeast Asia Video Music Award. Along with Lea Salonga and Regine Velasquez, Kyla was listed as Best Female Singer in a survey held by popular teen magazines Meg in her first full year in the music business alone. Kyla has six Awit Awards, including Best New Female Artist. FM Radio station KF FM even hailed her as Breakthrough Artist of the Year. On October 21, 2001, she joined the Himig Handog Sa Makabagong Kabataan song contest as one of the interpreters for Jonathan Manalo's song "Tara Tena" with Kaya and V3. The entry was eventually proclaimed the winner.

Kyla
Kyla opened 2002 with a bang, receiving the award for Female Artist of the Year from two of the country's most popular radio stations Magic 89.9. and Monster Radio RX 93.1. She was invited to perform at the MTV Asia Awards with British boy band Blue. Her self-titled album was released in 2002 which marked her debut as a songwriter, penning two compositions: "I'm Into You" and "This Day". She collaborated with Malaysian R&B artist, Ferhad for his single "What More". She joined the noontime variety show SOP as a regular host on April 14, 2002.

I Will Be There
Kyla's third album, I Will Be There became one of her most respected albums to date. The album showcased Kyla's versatility with R&B tracks "Bounce" and "I Will Find You" to ballad songs such as "I Will be There" and "Bakit Wala Ka Pa". The title track is penned by Mr. Ogie Alcasid, while "Naghihintay Lamang" is written by Janno Gibbs and "Feel So Good" by Rhada. There are a couple of reunions in "I Will Be There", as well. First is with Mr. Pure Energy Gary Valenciano as they do a duet with "Sana Maulit Muli". After their performance at the MTV Awards, Blue collaborated with Kyla on "Flexin'". In 2003, she performed with British boy band Blue at the MTV Asia Awards in Singapore singing their hit single "One Love". Irish singer Ronan Keating of the Boyzone performed with Kyla at the Araneta Coliseum on February 13, 2003.

On November 29, 2003, Kyla reunited with Jonathan Manalo and made a return to the Metropop Song Festival to interpret "Buti Na Lang", which eventually finished in third place. Kyla made special appearances in sitcoms and made her acting debut in the telenovela Narito Ang Puso Ko as Melanie. On June 19, 2003, she portrayed the life story of Sarah Geronimo in Magpakailanman (Pangarap Na Bituin: The Sarah Geronimo Story) which served as its first high-rated episode for season 2, beating Maalaala Mo Kaya with 28% ratings in the AGB Nielsen Philippines.

2004–2006: Not Your Ordinary Girl and Beautiful Days
She co-hosted GMA Channel 7's defunct Sunday variety show SOP. She opened 2004 with her birthday celebration at SOP with a surprise duet from American singer-songwriter and producer, Keith Martin. Kyla had included one of his songs in her Perfectly Acoustic compilation album released in December 2003. In May 2004, she released her biggest-selling album to date, Not Your Ordinary Girl. The album spawned five singles "Because Of You", "Human Nature", "If the Feeling Is Gone", "Not Your Ordinary Girl", and "Till They Take My Heart Away", all of which were No. 1 hit singles.

On November 12, 2004, Kyla held the Not Just Your Ordinary Girl concert at the Araneta Coliseum. It was a certified sold-out concert as well. The same year, she opened for Alicia Keys Live in Manila at the Araneta Coliseum. From 2006 to 2007, Kyla hosted Popstar Kids, a talent search for potential kids aired on QTV that produced teen singing sensation Julie Anne San Jose. In June 2006, Kyla released her fifth album under EMI Phils, Beautiful Days. The album features the popular single "Ngayong Wala Ka Na".

2007–2009: Heartfelt and Heart 2 Heart
In 2007, she released her sixth album, Heartfelt. Her first album of remakes, Heartfelt contained 17 tracks, 16 of which are remakes including hit singles "I Don't Want You to Go", "Love Will Lead You Back" and "It's Over Now", as well as an original composition, "Someone"

Kyla and Jay R also were given their own segment at SOP Rules called "Souled Out" which aired on GMA Network every Sunday. On October 6, 2007 (October 7 in the Philippines), she sang the Philippine National Anthem in Manny Pacquiao versus Marco Antonio Barrera fight at Mandalay Bay in Las Vegas, Nevada.

After Heartfelt, she released and co-produced her seventh album, 2008's Heart 2 Heart. The album produced the 2009 singles "Old Friend" and "Back in Time", written by Jay-R. "You Make Me Feel", written by Kyla and Jay R, won "Best R&B song at Awit Awards while "Back in Time" won OPM Song of the Year at the RX 93.1 Awards and Best Collaboration Award at the Wave 89.1 Urban Music Awards. In 2010, "Back in Time" also won "Favorite Song" at the MYX Music Awards.

2010–2013: Private Affair, international acclaim and collaborations, and hiatus
On February 14, 2010, she joined other artists for a special Valentine's Day concert. Kyla received nominations at 2010 MYX Music Awards including Favorite Female Artist, Favorite Mellow Video for Old Friend, Favorite Collaboration and Favorite Song for Back in Time with Jay R, and Favorite Remake for the album Heart 2 Heart In celebration of a 10-year prominence in the music industry, PolyEast Records released 27 of the "R&B royalty's" biggest hits in a two-CD compilation: Essence of Soul: The Hits Collection along with a new song, "Hanggang Wakas", a duet with Malaysian pop-R&B artist Hazami. Kyla is a regular performer-host of GMA's Sunday variety show Party Pilipinas. At this time, Kyla's tandem with Rachelle Ann Go (collectively known as "ShinKy") became popular at Party Pilipinas. On November 29, 2010, she and longtime music partner Jay R held a concert at the Music Museum, entitled "Soulmates". At that time, the two signed a contract with Terra Group in Indonesia.

While recording an album in Indonesia and Malaysia Her album, Private Affair, was released on November 30, 2010, under EMI and PolyEast Records. Its first single is "Mahal Kita (Di Mo Pansin)". Its second single, "Don't Tie Me Down", was released in January. Kyla was a featured artist in Indonesian R&B artist Joeniar Arief's new album Melayang Tinggi. The official music video for his third single "Indah Cinta Kita" featuring Kyla was released on the first week of August 2011 and became a big hit in Indonesia.

Michael Bolton and David Foster conveyed their admiration for Kyla's singing prowess upon hearing her sing "I Will Always Love You". Brian McKnight also expressed his desire to work with Kyla, referring to her as his "new favorite female vocalist". He wrote a song for her entitled "My Heart", which Kyla performed for the first time on November 6, 2011, at Party Pilipinas.

Before marrying Rich Alvarez, Kyla held a concert at Teatrino, Greenhills on November 11, 2011, called Depidida de Soltera.

Kyla was one of the cast of GMA Network's Primetime Time of My Life, the first-ever dance-themed series on Philippine Television. On December 11, 2011, Kyla sang the Philippine National Anthem in Brian Viloria versus Giovanni Segura boxing match at the Ynares Sports Arena in Pasig, Philippines. Kyla was one of the guests of Ogie Alcasid and Regine Velasquez concert at Araneta Coliseum, the Philippines on February 14, 2012, Mr. and Mrs. A. She sang Regine Velasquez's hit "Narito Ako".

On March 16, 2012, Brian McKnight performed "How do You Keep the Music Playing" with Kyla at his concert at the Araneta Coliseum.

Kyla recorded "Huling Sayaw" with rock band Kamikazee for the band's new album, Romantico. Released in April 2012, the song went on to be one of Kamikazee's most successful singles. "Huling Sayaw" won "Favorite Rock Video" at the 8th MYX Music Awards and was also nominated for "Favorite Collaboration".

On June 1, 2012, Christian Bautista and Kyla joined Vietnamese pop singers Tung Duong and Thanh Lam as they performed at the White Palace Convention Center in Ho Chi Minh City. Christian and Kyla were received warmly by the mostly Vietnamese members of the diplomatic corps, government officials, and the private sector. Christian sang I Believe I Can Fly and Can't Take My Eyes Off You, and Kyla sang Emotions and a Barbra Streisand medley. Then, they did a duet of We Could Be in Love before singing We Are The World with Tung Duong and Thanh Lam.

Kyla and Jay-R showcased the Filipino's world-renowned musicality when they performed at the Philippine National Day of World Expo 2012 held in Yeosu, South Korea on July 22, 2012.

Kyla interpreted the song "Be My Everything" originally written by Jessa Mae Gabon during A Song of Praise (ASOP) Music Festival 2012, the Philippines' first praise song competition on television. It was held at The Araneta Coliseum on September 24, 2012. ASOP music festival was an anticipated biannual event at MCGI and is in continuous search for best praise songs from composers within the organization alongside ASOP TV. She was a guest performer at Rachelle Ann Go's Rise Against Gravity concert at the Music Museum on October 26, 2012.

South Korean idol singer Jun.K of the boy band 2PM also expressed his wish to meet Kyla referring to her as "his favorite singer" during his visit to the Philippines in March 2013.

Short hiatus
On October 28, 2012, Kyla and husband Rich Alvarez announced that they are expecting their first baby at Party Pilipinas stating that they have "received the most beautiful blessing". At the time of the announcement, she was three months pregnant She remained a regular host and performer at Party Pilipinas until March 2013. She gave birth to a baby boy.

2014: Comeback with Journey and Philpop 2014
Shortly after her return to variety show Sunday All Stars in late 2013, Kyla began recording a new album. In March 2014, Kyla renewed her contract with EMI Philippines/PolyEast Records. She performed her new single "Kunwa-Kunwari Lang" on the April 8 episode of Myx Philippines's Myx VJ Search. On April 10, PolyEast Records released a lyric video of the single. On April 24, PolyEast announced that Journey was released May 10, 2014.

Kyla performed on MYX Live! on May 21. During a guest appearance at DZMM the following day, she revealed the already popular track "Dito Na Lang" as the follow-up single of the album. On May 29, it was announced that she would be taking part in the third Philippine Popular Music Festival as the interpreter for composer Jungee Marcelo's song entry entitled "Salbabida". The festival took place on July 26, where Kyla and the other interpreters performed the song live in Meralco Theater (there was a delayed telecast though), in front of the panel of judges. The song eventually took home the grand prize winner.

While Kyla still regularly performs at Sunday noon-time variety show Sunday All Stars, she is no longer an exclusive artist for GMA Network. On July 21–22, she made a guest appearance at Kris TV. Aside from Myx, this was her first guest appearance at the ABS-CBN network since Morning Girls with Kris and Korina in 2004. She was invited back to Kris TV on August 1 and performed "Dance with My Father" and "Because You Loved Me" in the show's tribute to the late Corazon Aquino and Benigno Aquino Jr. as well as its August 20–21 episode. Kyla made a guest appearance at ABS-CBN's Umagang Kay Ganda on August 4. She performed Sheena Easton's "It's Christmas (All Over The World)" and Gary Valenciano's "Pasko Na, Sinta Ko".

Kyla was invited to perform at the 11th Asia Song Festival on November 2 at the Asiad Main Stadium in South Korea She sang her songs "Don't Tie Me Down" and "My Heart". KBS aired the event on November 8. Kyla performed her single "Dito Na Lang" and "Huling Sayaw" (English translation: "Last Dance") with rock band Kamikazee at Myx Mo! 2014 at the Araneta Coliseum on November 11.

2015–present: Management Changes and Network Transfer
On January 21, 2015, she joined Cornerstone Entertainment. She gave her last performance at Sunday All Stars on February 1. On February 2, she performed at the Concert of Dreams, with Gary Valenciano, Zsa Zsa Padilla, Jed Madela, Kelly Rowland, and Ne-Yo. During an interview with the Manila Bulletin, Kyla revealed that she intended to switch to ABS-CBN. She remains a recurring guest at Kris TV and has made guest appearances at various shows including Aquino and Abunda Tonight, It's Showtime, Banana Split, and Gandang Gabi Vice. She made her first appearance at ASAP on its 20th anniversary on February 22. In March 2015, she recorded her first teleserye drama theme song with ABS-CBN for the TV series On the Wings of Love.

Flying High: The 15th Anniversary Concert

Kyla celebrated 15 years in the music industry with an album to be released in September and major concert on November 20, 2015, that was held at the Kia Theatre. Kyla launched her first YouTube channel in February 2016, featuring collaborations with other singers (known as "Kylaborations"). Kyla performs at ASAP with fellow R&B artists Jay R, KZ Tandingan, Jason Dy and Daryl Ong as part of the group ASAP Soul Sessions. The group disbanded in late 2017, after being replaced by ASAP Jambayan.

Queen of R&B
On December 6, 2016, Kyla signed a contract with Star Music after 16 years with  PolyEast Records / EMI Philippines The label then announced that she will release an album in the third quarter of 2017, but was delayed. On January 15, 2018, Star Music announced that Kyla will have double-lead singles and released the teaser for the first, entitled "Only Gonna Love You". The single was released on January 19, while the second lead single, "Fix You And Me" was released on February 2. Star Music announced that the album, Kyla (The Queen of R&B), will be released on March 17, 2018, but was delayed to April due to "health reasons". On April 16, her management confirmed that Kyla suffered a miscarriage in March. Less than a day after its release, the album became No. 1 selling album on iTunes Philippines and was sold out at the album launch on April 15.

In January 2018, Kyla later became a host and performer along with Angeline Quinto, Erik Santos and Daryl Ong on an ASAP segment titled ASAP TLC: The Love Connection which replaced ASAP LSS: Love Songs and Stories, however in April 2018, the original lineup were later relegated to only performing the songs, and the singing lineup was later shuffled as of August 2018. The segment ended after ASAP reformatted into ASAP Natin To.

Kyla took a 2-month break beginning in September 2018, which she later revealed was due to her sensitive pregnancy. On November 8, 2018, Kyla shared that she had suffered her second miscarriage via her Instagram account.

DIVAS 
On April 27, 2016, it was announced that Kyla would be a member of the girl group DIVAS, along with Yeng Constantino, KZ Tandingan, and Angeline Quinto (Rachelle Ann Go was originally intended to be part of the group, however, she was removed from the group due to international commitments). The poster of the concert was released on September 1, 2016.

On November 11, 2016, the group performed at the Smart Araneta Coliseum, staging their first concert entitled DIVAS Live in Manila.

On December 15, 2018, the DIVAS returned to the Smart Araneta Coliseum, through a concert with Boyz II Men entitled Boyz II Men with DIVAS.

Kyla and Jay R released a new single called "Undeniable" on November 12, 2020.

Artistry

Music and voice
Kyla is known for the "airy and raspy" quality of her singing voice, her soulful and R&B style of singing, her head tone and wide range, her use of Category 5 vocal style known as melisma, her versatility, and her ability to scat. In 2010, she sang Ella Fitzgerald's version of "How High the Moon", scatting for seven minutes.

Often mistakenly classified as a dramatic coloratura, Kyla actually possesses a lyric coloratura soprano voice with a vocal range spanning more than 4 octaves (C3 to C7), hitting a solid F5 chest voice in her songs such as "Buti Na Lang", F#5 in "Atin ang Walang Hanggan", a G5 in "Mahal Kita (Di Mo Pansin)" and a G#5 in her live cover of Aretha Franklin's version of "Somewhere Over the Rainbow".

Personal life
Kyla graduated from Philippine Christian University with a bachelor's degree in mass communication. Her father is a lawyer, and she has three siblings. As a songwriter, she is known for writing and singing female-empowerment themed compositions taken from personal experiences, gospel, and inspirational music such as her acclaimed songs "Always on Time" and "I'm All Yours". Kyla interpreted "Be My Everything", originally written by Jessa Mae Gabon during ASOP Music Festival 2012. She also sang "His Eye Is on the Sparrow" at a benefit concert.

Marriage
In 2005, Kyla began dating PBA player Rich Alvarez. Their relationship was closely followed by the media. After six years of dating, the couple announced their engagement on February 10, 2011. During her announcement at Party Pilipinas, Kyla performed her song, "Beautiful Days". Upon revealing their engagement video in July Party Pilipinas, she performed "Another You". On October 23, Kyla and Jay R performed their last duet together before Kyla's marriage.

On November 6, 2011, Kyla sang a song written for her by Brian McKnight, "My Heart", which became her wedding song.

Engagement and wedding
Though Kyla and Rich were both very much involved in the wedding preparations, the couple preferred to keep the wedding itself and the details private.

Kyla mentioned that she would not be singing at her wedding as she wants her friends to sing for her at this time. Following the release of their engagement video in Party Pilipinas in July 2011, Kyla revealed that the wedding would take place on November 28, 2011 at Santuario de San Antonio, a church between Forbes Park and Dasmariñas Village in Makati.

Broadcast
A day after the ceremony, a church wedding video was released featuring the song Beautiful Days, the song Kyla wrote for Rich five years ago.

GMA Network aired "A Beautiful Day: Kyla & Rich Alvarez Wedding Day TV special" on December 10–11, 2011, including the couple's personal story. On March 13, 2014, Kyla admitted to having first married Rich in secret before their November 2011 wedding. The two originally tied the knot in April 2011 through a civil wedding ceremony.

Kyla and Rich had their first child, Toby, in May 2013. On April 16, 2018, her management confirmed that Kyla suffered a miscarriage in March 2018. Kyla took a 2-month break beginning in September 2018, which she later revealed was due to her sensitive pregnancy. On November 8, 2018, Kyla shared that she had suffered her second miscarriage via her Instagram account.

Discography

Studio albums
 Way to Your Heart (2000)
 Kyla (2002)
 I Will Be There (2003)
 Not Your Ordinary Girl (2004)
 Beautiful Days (2006)
 Heartfelt (2007)
 Heart 2 Heart (2008)
 Private Affair (2010)
 Kyla (The Queen of R&B)  (2018)

Extended plays
 Journey (2014) 
Compilation albums
 Kyla at Her Best : The Fan-Made Album (2007)
 Heartsongs: Deluxe Edition (2009)
 Essence Of Soul: The Hits Collection (2010)
 ''My Very Best" (2015)

Filmography

Television dramas

Television shows

Awards and nominations 

Kyla has been the recipient of an MTV Video Music Award, twelve Awit Awards, four MTV Philippines Music Award, and six MYX Music Awards amongst many others. She was honored by the Philippines Society of Composers, Singers, and Publishers for her contributions to music as one of the first pioneers of R&B music in the country.

References

External links
 
 

1981 births
Living people
Filipino singer-songwriters
Filipino female models
GMA Network personalities
People from Tondo, Manila
Singers from Manila
Filipino women pop singers
Filipino contemporary R&B singers
21st-century Filipino actresses
ABS-CBN personalities
PolyEast Records artists
21st-century Filipino singers
21st-century Filipino women singers
Star Music artists